Newport is a  master-planned, mixed-use community in Downtown Jersey City, New Jersey, United States, consisting of retail, residential, office, and entertainment facilities.  The neighborhood is situated on the Hudson Waterfront on what had been the yards of Erie Railroad's Pavonia Terminal, located opposite Lower Manhattan and the neighborhood of Tribeca in New York City. Redevelopment of the neighborhood began in 1986 as a $10 billion project led by real-estate tycoon Samuel J. LeFrak and his firm The LeFrak Organization.

History
Newport's name was changed from "Newport City" to just "Newport" in 1988.

Transportation
The Hudson-Bergen Light Rail's Newport station and the PATH's Newport station are located in Newport. The area is also served by several New Jersey Transit bus lines, A&C Bus Corporation as well as other private bus lines. Interstate 78 is nearby and connects to the Holland Tunnel, which provides vehicle access to lower Manhattan, as well as to the New Jersey Turnpike Extension.

Land use

Retail shopping and dining

Part of the Newport community is the Newport Centre Mall, a large traditional indoor shopping complex anchored by Macy's, JCPenney, Sears, Kohl's, H&M, and ZARA.  Outside the mall and around the Newport area are a variety of primarily neighborhood oriented restaurants (known collectively as "The Restaurants at Newport") and retail stores (known collectively as "The Newport River Market") including a number of notables such as a Target store which opened in 2004, Staples and Best Buy.

Housing
As of 2014, the population of Newport is 15,000. Newport's approved master Redevelopment Plan contains an 'as-of-right' entitlement to build 9,000 units of residential housing.  Newport currently includes 10 high-rise rental apartment buildings comprising approximately 4,000 households.  Construction of these buildings began in 1985.  Newport's 10th rental apartment building, "The Aquablu," was completed and occupied in 2009.  Newport also includes 3 high-rise condominium apartment buildings comprising approximately 900 additional households.  Construction of these condominium buildings began in 1987.  The most recent condominium building, known as "The Shore Condominiums at Newport, North Tower" was completed in 2008.  Several adjacent residential buildings just south of Thomas Gangemi Drive along the 10th Street embankment are outside of the Newport Redevelopment Zone, but because they are developed by the LeFrak organization, are often advertised by real estate professionals as being in Newport, but are actually located outside it.

The residential buildings within Newport are:

John Adams
George Washington
James Madison
Thomas Jefferson
James Monroe (condo)
Riverside
Atlantic
East Hampton

South Hampton
Pacific
Parkside East
Parkside West
Shore Condominiums, North and South Towers
Aquablu
Laguna
Ellipse
The Beach

Many buildings offer views of Hudson River and the New York City skyline. A portion of the Hudson River Waterfront Walkway runs through Newport.

Hotels
Newport's approved master Redevelopment Plan contains an 'as-of-right' entitlement to build 1,200 hotel rooms.  A 187-room hotel known as the Courtyard by Marriott Jersey City-Newport opened just south of Newport in 2000.  A 429-room full-service hotel known as the Westin Newport, Jersey City opened at the beginning of 2009.

Office buildings
The first of these buildings, 111 Town Square Place, was built from the remnants of an abandoned warehouse in 1989 and contains both office and data centers. The most recent building, 100 Town Square Place was completed in 2003. Hundreds of different companies have headquarters or back-offices at Newport. These range from transportation companies such as EVA Air to major financial institutions. The neighborhood’s office towers provide more than six million square feet of office space to major employers including JP Morgan Chase, Citigroup, Fidelity Investments, L’Oreal, Forbes and Tory Burch and house more than 25,000 employees. In March 2019, the LeFrak Organization sold the 350,000 square foot office tower, 570 Washington Boulevard, for $170 million.

Newport 10000
The Newport 10,000, more popularly known as the Newport 10k, is a 10 kilometer road race (running) in the vicinity of the Hudson River Waterfront Walkway. Typically held the second weekend in May, the race tends to attract a strong regional and international field of elite runners. The course is a USATF certified and consists of flat local roads.

Gallery

References

External links

Newport Master Plan

Neighborhoods in Jersey City, New Jersey
Transit-oriented developments in the United States
New Jersey populated places on the Hudson River